Norma Ann Sykes (19 May 1936 – 24 November 2016), better known as Sabrina or Sabby, was a 1950s English glamour model who progressed to a minor film career.

Sabrina was one of "a host of exotic, glamorous (British) starlets ... modelled on the likes of Marilyn Monroe, Jayne Mansfield and Lana Turner"; others included Diana Dors, Belinda Lee, Shirley Eaton and Sandra Dorne.

Early life and career
Sabrina was born on 19 May 1936 at Stepping Hill Hospital in Stockport, Cheshire, to Walter and Annie Sykes. She lived in Buckingham Street, Heaviley, for about 13 years and attended St George's School there, before moving with her mother to Blackpool. She spent some time in hospital with rheumatic fever. At the age of 16, she moved to London, where she worked as a waitress and did some nude modelling, posing for Russell Gay in a photoshoot that led to her appearance on the five of spades in a deck of nude playing cards.

In 1955, she was chosen to play a dumb blonde in Arthur Askey's new television series Before Your Very Eyes (BBC 1952–56, ITV 1956–58). The show ran from 18 February 1955 to 20 April 1956, and made Sabrina a household name. She was promoted by the BBC as "the bosomy blonde who didn't talk", but surviving kinescope episodes show quite clearly that she did.

Around July 1955, James Beney, of Walton Films, released a 100-foot, 9.5 mm short glamour film, "At Home with Sabrina".

Goodnight with Sabrina (c.1958, 3:49 mins) is included with Beat Girl (1960), remastered in 2016 by BFI Flipside.

She made her film debut as Trixie in Stock Car, a Wolf Rilla-directed drama, in 1955. She then appeared in a small role in the 1956 film Ramsbottom Rides Again. In her third film, Blue Murder at St Trinian's (1957), she had a non-speaking role in which, despite sharing equal billing with the star Alastair Sim on posters and appearing in many publicity stills in school uniform, she was required only to sit up in bed wearing a nightdress, reading a book, while the action took place around her.

Sabrina's penultimate film role was in the western The Phantom Gunslinger (1970), in which she starred alongside Troy Donahue. Her final film was the horror movie The Ice House (1969), in which she replaced Jayne Mansfield, who had died in a car crash two years earlier.

Personal life
In 1958, she was awarded an honorary D.Litt. by the University of Leeds. On 27 November 1967 Sabrina married Dr. Harold Melsheimer (born 11 June 1927 in Germany), a Hollywood gynaecologist and obstetrician. They divorced ten years later.

In 2007, there were newspaper reports that Sabrina had become a hermit, "living in squalor" in a Spanish-style house on a street known as 'Smog Central', under the flightpath of Burbank Airport. Sabrina admitted that she was confined to the house due to back problems, but denied living in squalor.

Having suffered from ill health for many years, partly owing to botched back surgery, she died of blood poisoning in 2016, at the age of 80.

Cultural impact
 The comedy series The Goon Show contains numerous references to Sabrina's bosom, such as "By the measurements of Sabrina!" and "By the sweaters of Sabrina!"
 In "The Scandal Magazine", an episode of the radio programme Hancock's Half Hour, Sid James plays the editor of a sleazy gossip magazine that has carried an embarrassing story about Tony Hancock. James tells Hancock that his readers "will believe anything. ... If I told them that Sabrina was Arthur Askey's mother, they'd believe me." Hancock replies, "Well, I don't", pauses and asks, "She's not, is she?" James says emphatically "No", but Hancock reflects, "Mind you, there is a resemblance ..."
 Brewer's Dictionary of Phrase and Fable contains a definition for "Hunchfront of Lime Grove," "a somewhat unappealing nickname given to the generously endowed starlet known as Sabrina."
 In the 1950s members of the Royal Air Force dubbed parts of the Hawker Hunter jet fighter plane "Sabrinas" owing to two large cartridge collection pods on the underside of the aircraft. Similarly, in the late 1950s, when ERF, a British firm that made lorries (trucks), produced a semi-forward control heavy goods vehicle (HGV) with a short protruding bonnet, these vehicles were nicknamed "Sabrinas" because they had "a little more in front".
 The 1959 Triumph TR3S 1985 cc iron-block alloy-headed engine was called "Sabrina" because of its dome-shaped cam covers.
 In 1974, the British motoring press gave the name "Sabrinas" to the oversized pairs of protruding rubber bumper blocks (see dagmar bumpers) added to the MG MGB, Midget and Triumph TR6 sports cars, when U.S. safety regulations mandated sturdier impact protection. The name stuck and is used around the world.

Television appearances
 Before Your Very Eyes (1955–1956, ten episodes)
 Double Your Money (1955)
 Tarzan (one episode, 1967)
 This Is Your Life (Arthur Askey, 1974)

Acting credits
Stock Car (1955)
Ramsbottom Rides Again (1956)
Blue Murder at St Trinian's (1957)
 Goodnight with Sabrina (1958)
 Just My Luck (1957)
 Make Mine a Million (1959)
 Satan in High Heels (1962)
House of the Black Death (1965)
The Ice House (1969)
The Phantom Gunslinger (1970)

Notes

References

External links
 The Complete Sabrina (Norma Sykes) Encyclopaedia
 At Home – (Sabrina Encyclopaedia)
 http://www.npg.org.uk/collections/search/person/mp101768/norma-ann-sykes-sabrina
 
 Sabrina at aenigma
 1959 award of D.Litt. (Hon)

1936 births
2016 deaths
English film actresses
English female models
Actors from Stockport
Actors from Cheshire
English television actresses